= African Republic =

African Republic can refer to:

- Central African Republic
- South African Republic
